The IFSC Climbing European Championships are the biennial European championship for competition climbing organized by the International Federation of Sport Climbing (IFSC). The first competition was held in Frankfurt in 1992.

Championships 

1 EC 2007 Birmingham was replacement as EC 2006 Yekaterinburg (boulder)

Men's results

Lead

Bouldering

Speed

Overall

Women's Results

Lead

Bouldering

Speed

Overall

Medal summary (1992–2020)

See also 
 International Federation of Sport Climbing
 IFSC Climbing World Championships
 IFSC Paraclimbing World Championships
 IFSC Climbing World Youth Championships

References

External links 
 Calendar of IFSC competitions
 IFSC rules book 2013

 
Climbing competitions
Sport climbing